Agra is a genus of beetles in the family Carabidae, the ground beetles. There are over 500 described species, but there are well over 1000 specimens in collections that have not yet been described. The common name elegant canopy beetles has been used for genus Agra.

Beetles of this genus have narrow heads and long, constricted necks. The tarsomeres, or the "feet" of the beetle, are wide and equipped with pads, allowing the beetle to grip leaves as it moves about and rests on plants. Females have "telescopic" reproductive organs, which they use to deposit eggs deep in the substrate.

Adults of some species are probably predators of other arthropods. Some have also been seen drinking sap and eating pollen. Adult beetles are nocturnal and attracted to lights. They rest on the undersides of leaves with their bodies aligned along the midrib, legs and antennae tucked in. The larvae develop in burrows and under tree bark, and are likely predatory.

Adult beetles have anti-predator secretions that are offensive to predators; they have been noted to repel bats.

Species include:

 Agra absurdis Liebke, 1938 
 Agra aculeata Chaudoir, 1854 
 Agra acuspina Straneo, 1979 
 Agra acutidens Straneo, 1965 
 Agra acutoides Straneo, 1982 
 Agra aeneipennis Chaudoir, 1861 
 Agra aeneola Bates, 1883 
 Agra aeris Erwin, 2000 
 Agra aeroides Erwin, 1983 
 Agra alinahui Erwin, 2000 
 Agra alternata Klug, 1834 
 Agra alvarengai Straneo, 1982 
 Agra amabilis Chaudoir, 1863 
 Agra amoena Chaudoir, 1861 
 Agra andina Liebke, 1938 
 Agra andrewesi Liebke, 1938 
 Agra anguinea Bates, 1865 
 Agra anthrax Erwin, 1986 
 Agra ardoini Straneo, 1982 
 Agra ariasi Erwin, 1982 
 Agra arrowi Liebke, 1938 
 Agra asymetrica Straneo, 1979 
 Agra aterrima Klug, 1824 
 Agra atlas Erwin, 1984 
 Agra atriperna Erwin, 1984 
 Agra attenuata Klug, 1824 
 Agra aurata Bates, 1865 
 Agra aurea Liebke, 1940 
 Agra aureoviridis Straneo, 1982 
 Agra auricula Liebke, 1940 
 Agra aurifera Liebke, 1940 
 Agra auripennis Liebke, 1940 
 Agra auronitens Bates, 1883 
 Agra aurora Liebke, 1940 
 Agra aurovittata Chaudoir, 1850 
 Agra azurea Chaudoir, 1861 
 Agra azureipennis Erwin, 1982 
 Agra baccii (Straneo, 1958) 
 Agra bahiae Straneo, 1965 
 Agra baleni Steinheil, 1875 
 Agra barrensis Straneo, 1955 
 Agra basilewskyi Straneo, 1955 
 Agra bci Erwin, 2000 
 Agra belize Erwin, 1984 
 Agra besckei Liebke, 1940 
 Agra bicolor Straneo, 1979 
 Agra bicoloripes Straneo, 1955 
 Agra bicostata Bates, 1865 
 Agra biexcavata Straneo, 1958 
 Agra biexcisa Chaudoir, 1866 
 Agra bifaria Chaudoir, 1866 
 Agra biolat Erwin, 2000 
 Agra biseriatella Straneo, 1955 
 Agra blumax Erwin, 1983 
 Agra boggianii Straneo, 1955 
 Agra bogotana Straneo, 1979 
 Agra boliviana Liebke, 1951 
 Agra bonsi Straneo, 1979 
 Agra bonvouloiri Chaudoir, 1866 
 Agra borgmeieri Liebke, 1940 
 Agra brentoides Latreille & Dejean, 1823 
 Agra brevicollis Klug, 1824 
 Agra brevicornis Bates, 1865 
 Agra brevithorax Straneo, 1965 
 Agra brunnea Liebke, 1940 
 Agra brunneipennis Gory, 1833 
 Agra brunneitarsis Straneo, 1958 
 Agra brunneoviridis Straneo, 1979 
 Agra brunnescens Straneo, 1965 
 Agra buqueti Gory, 1833 
 Agra cachimbana Straneo, 1965 
 Agra cachimbo Erwin, 1984 
 Agra cadabra Erwin, 1986 
 Agra cajennensis (Olivier, 1795) 
 Agra calamitas Erwin, 1986 
 Agra caligata Liebke 1951 
 Agra caligo Erwin, 1982 
 Agra callidoides Straneo, 1979 
 Agra campana Erwin, 1983 
 Agra cancellata Dejean 1831 
 Agra capitata Straneo, 1958 
 Agra castanea Straneo, 1965 
 Agra castaneipes Bates, 1883 
 Agra castanoptera Straneo, 1965 
 Agra catascopoides Straneo, 1965 
 Agra catbellae Erwin, 2002 
 Agra catenulata Klug, 1824 
 Agra catie Erwin, 2002 
 Agra cauca Erwin, 1998 
 Agra cavei Erwin, 1984 
 Agra ce Erwin, 2010 
 Agra cephalota Liebke 1938 
 Agra chalcea Klug, 1834 
 Agra chalcoptera Klug, 1834 
 Agra championi Bates, 1883 
 Agra chapada Erwin, 1987 
 Agra chaudoiri Bates, 1865 
 Agra chlorocera Chaudoir, 1863 
 Agra chocha Erwin, 1986 
 Agra chrysis Bates, 1865 
 Agra chrysopteryx Bates, 1878 
 Agra cicatricosa Chaudoir, 1861 
 Agra clavata Liebke, 1951 
 Agra clavipes Klug, 1834 
 Agra cobra Erwin, 1982 
 Agra cochlearis Liebke, 1938 
 Agra coeps Erwin, 1982 
 Agra coerulea Chaudoir, 1854 
 Agra colasi Straneo, 1965 
 Agra columbiana Chaudoir, 1861 
 Agra communis Straneo, 1965 
 Agra confusa Chaudoir, 1854 
 Agra conhormigas Erwin, 2000 
 Agra conicollis Straneo, 1965 
 Agra constans Erwin, 1984 
 Agra coptoptera Chaudoir, 1861 
 Agra cornicola Liebke, 1940 
 Agra costaricensis Liebke, 1940 
 Agra crassicornis Liebke, 1940 
 Agra crassipes Liebke, 1951 
 Agra crebrefoveata Straneo, 1965 
 Agra crebrepunctata Straneo, 1955 
 Agra cribriceps Straneo, 1965 
 Agra cribricollis Chaudoir, 1861 
 Agra cruciaria Erwin, 2010 
 Agra csikii Liebke, 1940 
 Agra cuneolus Erwin, 1983 
 Agra cuprea Klug, 1824 
 Agra cupreola Chaudoir, 1847 
 Agra cupripennis Dejean, 1831 
 Agra cuproptera Liebke, 1940 
 Agra cyanea Chaudoir, 1861 
 Agra cyanescens Lucas, 1857 
 Agra cyaneucnemes Erwin, 1984 
 Agra cyanippe Bates, 1891 
 Agra cyanosticta Klug, 1834 
 Agra cyanoviridis Straneo, 1979 
 Agra cynthia Buquet, 1835 
 Agra cytherea J.Thomson, 1857 
 Agra dable Erwin, 2002 
 Agra dafne Straneo, 1965 
 Agra darlingtoni Straneo, 1955 
 Agra dation Erwin, 1987 
 Agra dax Erwin, 2000 
 Agra delgadoi Erwin, 2002 
 Agra demerasae Erwin, 1984 
 Agra denticulata Steinheil 1875 
 Agra dentipennis Liebke, 1951 
 Agra diagonalis Straneo, 1966 
 Agra dimidiata Chevrolat 1856 
 Agra dominula Bates, 1865 
 Agra dora Erwin, 1984 
 Agra dorazul Erwin, 1984 
 Agra driades Straneo, 1965 
 Agra dryas Erwin, 1982 
 Agra duckworlhorum Erwin, 2000 
 Agra duplicata Liebke, 1938 
 Agra ecaligis Erwin, 1982 
 Agra ega Erwin, 1982 
 Agra elaina Bates, 1883 
 Agra eowilsoni Erwin, 1998 
 Agra eponine Erwin, 2000 
 Agra erythrocera Brulle 1837 
 Agra erythropus Dejean 1825 
 Agra eucera Erwin, 1984 
 Agra eucnemes Erwin, 1984 
 Agra eurypelma Bates, 1883 
 Agra exarata Klug, 1824 
 Agra excavata Klug, 1824 
 Agra exsculpta Liebke, 1951 
 Agra fada Chevrolat 1856 
 Agra falcon Erwin, 2000 
 Agra fallax Liebke, 1951 
 Agra falsisagax Erwin, 1982 
 Agra famula Liebke, 1940 
 Agra feisthameli Buquet, 1835 
 Agra felix Liebke, 1951 
 Agra femoralis Chaudoir, 1861 
 Agra femorata Klug, 1824 
 Agra filicornis Straneo, 1955 
 Agra filiformis Dejean, 1831 
 Agra fimbriata Straneo, 1965 
 Agra flava Straneo, 1966 
 Agra flavipes Straneo, 1982 
 Agra foraminosa Liebke, 1938 
 Agra forluna Erwin, 1983 
 Agra formicaria Thomson, 1857 
 Agra foveella Liebke, 1937 
 Agra foveigera Chaudoir, 1861 
 Agra foveipennis Chaudoir, 1866 
 Agra foveolata Chaudoir, 1850 
 Agra fryi Chaudoir, 1866 
 Agra fugax Erwin, 2002 
 Agra fulvicauda Bates, 1883 
 Agra funebris Straneo, 1965 
 Agra fuseipes Straneo, 1979 
 Agra gaudiola Bates, 1865 
 Agra gemmata Klug, 1824 
 Agra geniculata Klug, 1824 
 Agra geographiea Straneo, 1965 
 Agra germaini Liebke, 1938 
 Agra giesberti Erwin, 2002 
 Agra glauca Liebke, 1951 
 Agra goryi Chaudoir, 1847 
 Agra gounellei Liebke, 1938 
 Agra goyasensis Straneo, 1965 
 Agra goyazella Erwin, 1984 
 Agra grace Erwin, 2010 
 Agra gracilis Lucas 1857 
 Agra graminea Bates, 1865 
 Agra granodeoro Erwin, 2002 
 Agra gravis Straneo, 1966 
 Agra guatemalena Csiki, 1932 
 Agra guyanensis (Chaudoir, 1863) 
 Agra hespenheide Erwin, 2000 
 Agra hilaris Liebke, 1938 
 Agra hirta Straneo, 1965 
 Agra honesta Chaudoir, 1854 
 Agra hovorei Erwin, 2000 
 Agra howdenorum Erwin, 1982 
 Agra huambana Straneo, 1982 
 Agra humboldti Liebke, 1951 
 Agra humeralis Straneo, 1966 
 Agra hyalina Chaudoir, 1861 
 Agra hypsophila Straneo, 1966 
 Agra ichabod Erwin, 2002 
 Agra ictina Bates, 1883 
 Agra ignobilis Chaudoir, 1872 
 Agra imaginis Erwin, 1986 
 Agra immersa Klug, 1824 
 Agra inbio Erwin, 2000 
 Agra inca Erwin, 1986 
 Agra incerta Straneo, 1979 
 Agra incisa Liebke, 1938 
 Agra infuscata Klug, 1824 
 Agra inops Straneo, 1979 
 Agra inpa Erwin, 1983 
 Agra insidiosa Bates, 1883 
 Agra intermedia Straneo, 1958 
 Agra invicta Erwin, 1982 
 Agra iota Erwin, 1984 
 Agra iquitosana Erwin, 1982 
 Agra iris Liebke, 1938 
 Agra itatiaya Erwin, 1986 
 Agra iycisca Buquet 1835 
 Agra janzeni Erwin, 2002 
 Agra jedlickai Liebke, 1938 
 Agra jimwappes Erwin, 2002 
 Agra julie Erwin, 2002 
 Agra katewinsletae Erwin, 2002 
 Agra kayae Erwin, 1984 
 Agra ketschuana Liebke, 1951 
 Agra klugii Brulle, 1837 
 Agra lacrymosa Straneo, 1965 
 Agra laeticolor Bates, 1878 
 Agra laetipes Straneo, 1965 
 Agra lamproptera Chaudoir, 1847 
 Agra lata Erwin, 1987 
 Agra laticeps Bates, 1865 
 Agra latifemoris Straneo, 1982 
 Agra latipes Chaudoir, 1861 
 Agra lavernae Erwin, 1978 
 Agra leprieuri Buquet 1835 
 Agra liebkei Straneo, 1958 
 Agra ligulata Liebke, 1940 
 Agra lilu Erwin, 2000 
 Agra limulus Erwin, 1982 
 Agra lindae Erwin, 2000 
 Agra littleorum Erwin, 1984 
 Agra liv Erwin, 2002 
 Agra lobata Straneo, 1982 
 Agra longelytrata Straneo, 1965 
 Agra longicornis Liebke 1938 
 Agra longula Chaudoir, 1866 
 Agra loricata Liebke 1940 
 Agra luctuosa Straneo, 1979 
 Agra luehea Erwin, 1983 
 Agra lugubris Straneo, 1979 
 Agra lutea Liebke 1938 
 Agra macra Steinheil 1875 
 Agra macracantha Bates, 1883 
 Agra macrodera Chaudoir, 1866 
 Agra magdalena Erwin, 1987 
 Agra magnifica Erwin, 2000 
 Agra maia Erwin, 2010 
 Agra manu Erwin, 2000 
 Agra maracay Erwin, 2000 
 Agra mathani Straneo, 1965 
 Agra mauritii Straneo, 1982 
 Agra max Erwin, 2010
 Agra maxli Erwin, 1982 
 Agra maya Liebke 1951 
 Agra megaera J,Thomson 1857 
 Agra melanogqna Chaudoir, 1861 
 Agra memnon Erwin, 1987 
 Agra metallescens Chaudoir, 1847 
 Agra mexicana Buquet 1835 
 Agra mime Erwin, 2000 
 Agra minasianus Erwin, 2010 
 Agra mira Liebke 1938 
 Agra mirabilis Straneo, 1966 
 Agra misella Straneo, 1965 
 Agra mixta Straneo, 1965 
 Agra mnemosine Straneo, 1965 
 Agra mniszechi Erwin, 1982 
 Agra modesta Straneo, 1979 
 Agra moerens Chaudoir, 1861 
 Agra moesta Chaudoir, 1861 
 Agra moira Erwin, 1983 
 Agra monteverde Erwin, 2002 
 Agra monticola Liebke, 1938 
 Agra moritzi Chaudoir, 1861 
 Agra muehlei Straneo, 1982 
 Agra mulieris Liebke 1951 
 Agra multifoveolata Steinheil, 1875 
 Agra multiplicata Klug, 1824 
 Agra multipunctata Straneo, 1965 
 Agra multisetosa Bates, 1883 
 Agra mustela Bates, 1865 
 Agra negrei Straneo, 1966 
 Agra nevermanni Liebke, 1938 
 Agra nex Erwin, 2000
 Agra nicki Schweiger, 1952
 Agra nickiana Straneo, 1955
 Agra nigra Liebke, 1951
 Agra nigrarima Erwin, 1984
 Agra nigrella Straneo, 1965
 Agra nigripes Chaudoir, 1847 
 Agra nigritarsis Straneo, 1982 
 Agra nigritula Straneo, 1955 
 Agra nigriventris Chaudoir, 1861 
 Agra nigroaenea Chaudoir, 1854 
 Agra nigrocyanea Straneo, 1955 
 Agra nigrotibiata Straneo, 1965 
 Agra nigroviridis Straneo, 1982 
 Agra nodicornis Straneo, 1965 
 Agra nola Erwin, 1986 
 Agra not Erwin, 2002 
 Agra notcatie Erwin, 2002 
 Agra notichlora Erwin, 1984 
 Agra notiocyanea Erwin, 1984 
 Agra notpusilla Erwin, 2010
 Agra nova Straneo, 1982 
 Agra novoaurora Erwin, 2000 
 Agra nox Erwin, 1984 
 Agra oblongopunctata Chevrolat 1835 
 Agra obscura Chaudoir, 1861 
 Agra obscuripes Chaudoir, 1854 
 Agra obscuritibiis Straneo, 1965 
 Agra occipitalis Bates, 1865 
 Agra ocellata Liebke, 1938 
 Agra ohausi Liebke, 1938 
 Agra oiapoquensis Erwin, 1982 
 Agra olfersi Straneo, 1966 
 Agra olivella Bates, 1883 
 Agra olivencana Erwin, 1982 
 Agra optima Bates, 1865 
 Agra orabrocha Erwin, 1984 
 Agra orinocensis Erwin, 2000 
 Agra osculatii Guerin-Meneville, 1855 
 Agra othello Erwin, 2000 
 Agra ovicollis Chaudoir, 1861 
 Agra oxyptera Chaudoir, 1861 
 Agra pacifica Bates, 1891 
 Agra pala Liebke, 1937 
 Agra pallens Lucas 1857 
 Agra pallida Liebke, 1937 
 Agra pallipes Liebke, 1938 
 Agra palmata Steinheil, 1875 
 Agra paloma Erwin, 1984 
 Agra panamensis Bates, 1878 
 Agra para Erwin, 1987 
 Agra paradoxa Straneo, 1979 
 Agra paratax Erwin, 2000 
 Agra parumfoveata Straneo, 1965 
 Agra pavonina Straneo, 1965 
 Agra pearsoni Erwin, 1984 
 Agra peccata Liebke, 1940 
 Agra pehlkei Liebke, 1938 
 Agra pennyi Erwin, 1982 
 Agra perexcisa Straneo, 1965 
 Agra perforata Liebke, 1938 
 Agra perinvicta Erwin, 1982 
 Agra perkinsorum Erwin, 1986 
 Agra perrinae Straneo, 1982 
 Agra pertzeli Liebke, 1951 
 Agra peruana Liebke, 1951 
 Agra phaearlhra Chaudoir, 1866 
 Agra phaenicodera (Bates, 1865) 
 Agra phaenoptera Chaudoir, 1854 
 Agra phaeogena Bates, 1865 
 Agra phainops Erwin, 1986 
 Agra phallica Erwin, 2002 
 Agra phite Erwin, 1987 
 Agra pia Liebke, 1940 
 Agra pichincha Erwin, 2000 
 Agra picipes Klug, 1834 
 Agra piligera Straneo, 1982 
 Agra piranha Erwin, 2010 
 Agra pitilla Erwin, 2002 
 Agra plantipedis Liebke, 1951 
 Agra platyscelis (Chaudoir, 1861) 
 Agra plaumanni Liebke, 1940 
 Agra plebeja Chaudoir, 1872 
 Agra polita Lucas 1857 
 Agra prasina Liebke, 1940 
 Agra prodigiosa Liebke, 1938 
 Agra proxima Straneo, 1982 
 Agra pseuderythropus Erwin, 1982 
 Agra pseudoboliviana Straneo, 1965 
 Agra pseudolaetipes Straneo, 1979 
 Agra pseudolutea Straneo, 1982 
 Agra pseudomoesta Straneo, 1965 
 Agra pseudopusilla Erwin, 2010 
 Agra pseudorufitarsis Straneo, 1965 
 Agra pseudovarians Straneo, 1965 
 Agra pujoli Straneo, 1965 
 Agra pulchella Chaudoir, 1861 
 Agra pulchra Straneo, 1982 
 Agra pulla Chaudoir, 1866 
 Agra punctata Straneo, 1955 
 Agra punctatella Straneo, 1958 
 Agra punctatostriata Chaudoir, 1861 
 Agra puncticeps Straneo, 1982 
 Agra puncticollis Dejean, 1825 
 Agra punctigera Straneo, 1958 
 Agra punctulata Liebke, 1951 
 Agra pupilla Liebke, 1940 
 Agra purpurea Bates, 1883 
 Agra quadricephala Straneo, 1955 
 Agra quadrilamata Straneo, 1965 
 Agra quadriseriata Lansberge, 1866 
 Agra quadrispinosa Chaudoir, 1872 
 Agra quararibea Erwin, 1993 
 Agra quesada Erwin, 2002 
 Agra raffaellae Straneo, 1982 
 Agra reflexidens Chaudoir, 1861 
 Agra regina Liebke 1951 
 Agra regularis Klug, 1834 
 Agra relucens Schweiger 1952 
 Agra resplendens Chaudoir, 1866 
 Agra rhomboides Erwin, 1982 
 Agra risseri Erwin, 2010 
 Agra rondonia Erwin, 2000 
 Agra rosea Liebke, 1940 
 Agra rosettae Straneo, 1960 
 Agra rotundangula Straneo, 1955 
 Agra rubra Erwin, 1987 
 Agra rubricephala (Straneo, 1982) 
 Agra rubricollis (Chaudoir, 1863) 
 Agra rubripes Straneo, 1955 
 Agra rubrocuprea Bates, 1865 
 Agra rubrofemorata Straneo, 1958 
 Agra rubroviolacea Straneo, 1965 
 Agra rufarima Erwin, 1984 
 Agra rufescens Klug, 1824 
 Agra ruficornis Klug, 1824 
 Agra rufipes Fabrlcius, 1801 
 Agra rufitarsis Straneo, 1955 
 Agra rufiventris Bates, 1883 
 Agra rufoaenea Chevrolat, 1835 
 Agra rufonigra Straneo, 1965 
 Agra rugosostriata Chaudoir, 1854 
 Agra rutilipennis Laporte De Castelnau, 1835 
 Agra sagax Liebke, 1940 
 Agra sahlbergii Chaudoir, 1854 
 Agra saltatrix Erwin, 1982 
 Agra samiria Erwin, 2000 
 Agra santarema Chaudoir, 1866 
 Agra santarosa Erwin, 2002 
 Agra saramax Erwin, 1993
 Agra sasquatch Erwin, 1982 
 Agra satipo Erwin, 1984 
 Agra saundersi Bates, 1865 
 Agra schwarzeneggeri Erwin, 2002 
 Agra scrobipennis Chaudoir, 1863 
 Agra seabrae Erwin, 1982 
 Agra semifulva Bates, 1883 
 Agra semiviridis (Straneo, 1968) 
 Agra seriefoveata Chaudoir, 1877 
 Agra serra Erwin, 1984 
 Agra servatorum Erwin, 2000 
 Agra seticollis Straneo, 1982 
 Agra setifemoris Straneo, 1982 
 Agra setigera Liebke, 1938 
 Agra sexdentata Straneo, 1982 
 Agra sigillata Liebke, 1940 
 Agra similis Schweiger, 1952 
 Agra simillima Straneo, 1965 
 Agra simplex Liebke, 1940 
 Agra sirena Erwin, 2002 
 Agra sironyx Erwin, 1984 
 Agra smaragdina Chaudoir, 1866 
 Agra smaragdinipennis (Steinheil, 1875) 
 Agra smaragdula Liebke, 1938 
 Agra smurf Erwin, 2000 
 Agra soccata Bates, 1883 
 Agra solanoi Erwin, 2002 
 Agra solimoes Erwin, 2000 
 Agra solisi Erwin, 2002 
 Agra soror Chaudoir, 1866 
 Agra sparsepunctata Straneo, 1982 
 Agra sphenarion Erwin, 1982 
 Agra spina Erwin, 1983 
 Agra spinicauda Straneo, 1982 
 Agra spinipennis Chaudoir, 1850 
 Agra spinosa Liebke, 1940 
 Agra splendida Dejean 1829 
 Agra steinbachi Liebke, 1951 
 Agra sternitica Straneo, 1982 
 Agra stockwelli Erwin, 1984 
 Agra strandi Liebke, 1940 
 Agra strangulata Chaudoir, 1863 
 Agra striatifemoris Liebke, 1940 
 Agra striatopunctata Chaudoir, 1866 
 Agra subcoerulea Straneo, 1965 
 Agra subgemmata Straneo, 1965 
 Agra sublaevicollis Straneo, 1965 
 Agra sublaevigata Straneo, 1965 
 Agra subpallipes Straneo, 1982 
 Agra subtilicornis Straneo, 1982 
 Agra subtilis Straneo, 1982 
 Agra superba Erwin, 2000 
 Agra suprema Erwin, 2000 
 Agra surinama Csiki, 1932 
 Agra suturalis Lucas, 1857 
 Agra tarapoto Erwin, 1984 
 Agra tarapotoana Erwin, 1982 
 Agra tarnieri Chaudoir, 1861 
 Agra tenuis Chaudoir, 1863 
 Agra terebrata Straneo, 1966 
 Agra tessera Erwin, 1983 
 Agra tetraspina Straneo, 1982 
 Agra thiemei Liebke, 1940 
 Agra thomsoni Liebke, 1940 
 Agra tibialis Chaudoir, 1861 
 Agra tingo Erwin, 2000 
 Agra tingomaria Erwin, 1984 
 Agra tiputini Erwin, 2010 
 Agra titan Erwin, 1982 
 Agra titschacki Liebke, 1951 
 Agra tremolerasi Liebke, 1940 
 Agra tricarinata Straneo, 1965 
 Agra tricolor Liebke, 1940 
 Agra tricuspidata Straneo, 1979 
 Agra tridentata (Olivier, 1795) 
 Agra triseriata Chaudoir, 1861 
 Agra tristis Dejean 1831 
 Agra trochanterica Straneo, 1965 
 Agra truquii Chaudoir, 1866 
 Agra tubercolata Straneo, 1965 
 Agra tuitis Erwin, 1987 
 Agra tumatumari Erwin, 1982 
 Agra turrialba Erwin, 2002 
 Agra tuxtlas Erwin, 2000 
 Agra ubicki Erwin, 2002 
 Agra urania Straneo, 1965 
 Agra valentina Bates, 1865 
 Agra vanemdeni Straneo, 1955 
 Agra varceicola Erwin, 1982 
 Agra variabilis Straneo, 1982 
 Agra varians Chaudoir, 1861 
 Agra variipes Liebke, 1951 
 Agra varioligera Chaudoir, 1863 
 Agra variolosa Klug, 1824 
 Agra vate Erwin, 1986 
 Agra vation Erwin, 1983 
 Agra venatrix Liebke, 1951 
 Agra venezuelana Straneo, 1982 
 Agra venustula Straneo, 1958 
 Agra vesedes Erwin, 1984 
 Agra vicina Chaudoir, 1847 
 Agra vidua Straneo, 1965 
 Agra violacea Straneo, 1966 
 Agra violante Liebke, 1940 
 Agra virgata Chevrolat, 1856 
 Agra viridicollis Straneo, 1965 
 Agra viridipennis Straneo, 1958 
 Agra viridipleuris Straneo, 1965 
 Agra viridipunctata Chaudoir, 1854 
 Agra viridisticta Chaudoir, 1861 
 Agra viridistriata Schweiger 1952 
 Agra viridula Straneo, 1965 
 Agra vulgaris Straneo, 1965 
 Agra winnie Erwin, 2002 
 Agra xingu Erwin, 1984 
 Agra yeti Erwin, 1982 
 Agra yoda Erwin, 1982 
 Agra yodella Erwin, 1982 
 Agra yola Erwin, 2000 
 Agra zapotal Erwin, 2000 
 Agra zellibori Straneo, 1966 
 Agra zischkai Straneo, 1955 
 Agra zona Erwin, 1983 
 Agra zumbado Erwin, 2002 
 Agra zuniga Erwin, 2002

References

Lebiinae
Carabidae genera